The 1902 season was the first season of competitive football in Brazil. This was the first season of the São Paulo State Championship, the first official tournament contested in Brazil.

Campeonato Paulista

First Stage

Final

São Paulo Athletic declared as the Campeonato Paulista champions.

References
 Brazilian competitions at RSSSF

 
Seasons in Brazilian football
Brazil